Moto Esporte Clube, commonly referred to as Moto Clube, is a currently inactive Brazilian football club based in Porto Velho, Rondônia. They won the Campeonato Rondoniense ten times and the Torneio de Integração da Amazônia twice.

History
The club was founded on 13 May 1952. Moto Clube won the Campeonato Rondoniense in 1954, 1968, 1969, 1971, 1972, 1975, 1976, 1977, 1980 and in 1981, and won the Torneio de Integração da Amazônia in 1977 and in 1978.

Achievements
Campeonato Rondoniense: 10
1954, 1968, 1969, 1971, 1972, 1975, 1976, 1977, 1980, 1981
Campeonato Rondoniense Second Division: 1
2009
Torneio de Integração da Amazônia: 2
1977, 1978

Stadium
Moto Esporte Clube played their home games at Estádio Aluízio Ferreira. The stadium has a maximum capacity of 4,000 people.

References

External links
 Official website

Inactive football clubs in Brazil
Football clubs in Rondônia
Association football clubs established in 1952
1952 establishments in Brazil